Ribes malvaceum, the chaparral currant, is a member of the Grossulariaceae (gooseberry family).

Description
This perennial shrub lacks the characteristic nodal spines which are demonstrated on the stems of many other members in the genus Ribes. The leaf blades (20–50 mm) are densely hairy, glandular, and double toothed.

Inflorescences are 10–25 flowered and open, occurring October to April in native range.  The hypanthium (5–8 mm) is pink and about twice as long as it is wide.  The sepals are pink-purple in color and are 4–6 mm.  Petals are 2–3 mm and can range in color from pink shades to white.  The flower also contains two fused styles which are fused to the tip and have a hairy base.

Striking glaucous purple berries are produced. The (6–7 mm fruit is glandular and covered by white hairs.

Varieties
There are several varieties of R. malvaceum:
Ribes malvaceum var. clementinum — (Dunkle) 
Ribes malvaceum var. malvaceum — plants with dark green leaves occurring below .
Ribes malvaceum var. viridifolium — (Abrams) — plants with bright green leaves occurring up to

Cultivation
Ribes malvaceum is cultivated as an ornamental plant by specialty plant nurseries. It is used in traditional gardens, native plant landscapes, and as bird food source in habitat gardens. It thrives under oaks in bright dry conditions, and in many other locations.

Pollination ecologists have reported the plant important as a honey plant for attracting large numbers of native bees.

References

External links

Jepson Flora Project: Ribes malvaceum
Ribes malvaceum — U.C. Photo gallery

malvaceum
Flora of Baja California
Flora of California
Flora of the Sierra Nevada (United States)
Natural history of the California chaparral and woodlands
Natural history of the California Coast Ranges
Natural history of the Channel Islands of California
Natural history of the Peninsular Ranges
Natural history of the San Francisco Bay Area
Natural history of the Santa Monica Mountains
Natural history of the Transverse Ranges
Berries
Bird food plants
Garden plants of North America
Shrubs
Drought-tolerant plants
Flora without expected TNC conservation status